Diethylaluminium chloride, abbreviated DEAC, is an organoaluminium compound.  Although usually given the chemical formula (C2H5)2AlCl, it exists as a dimer, [(C2H5)2AlCl]2 It is a precursor to Ziegler-Natta catalysts employed for the production of polyolefins. The compound is also a Lewis acid, useful in organic synthesis.  The compound is a colorless waxy solid, but is usually handled as a solution in hydrocarbon solvents.  It is highly reactive, even pyrophoric.

Structure
Compounds of the empirical formula AlR2Cl (R = alkyl, aryl) exist as dimers with the formula (R2Al)2(μ-Cl)2. The aluminium adopts a tetrahedral geometry.

Production 
Diethylaluminium chloride can be produced from ethylaluminium sesquichloride, (C2H5)3Al2Cl3, by reduction with sodium:

2 (C2H5)3Al2Cl3 + 3 Na → 3 (C2H5)2AlCl + Al + 3 NaCl
It is also obtained from the reaction of triethylaluminium with hydrochloric acid:
(C2H5)3Al + HCl → (C2H5)2AlCl + C2H6
Reproportionation reactions can also be used:
2 (C2H5)3Al + AlCl3 → 3 (C2H5)2AlCl
(C2H5)3Al2Cl3 + (C2H5)3Al → 3 (C2H5)2AlCl

Uses 
Diethylaluminium chloride and other organoaluminium compounds are used in combination with transition metal compounds as Ziegler–Natta catalysts for the polymerization of various alkenes.

As a Lewis acid, diethylaluminium chloride also has uses in organic synthesis. For example, it is used to catalyze the Diels–Alder and ene reactions. Alternatively, it can react as a nucleophile or a proton scavenger.

Safety
Diethylaluminium chloride is not only flammable but pyrophoric.

References
 Hu, Y. J.; Jiang, H. L.; Wang, H. H., "Preparation of highly branched polyethylene with acenaphthenediimine nickel chloride/diethylaluminum chloride catalyst". Chinese Journal of Polymer Science 2006, 24 (5), 483–488.
 Yao, Y. M.; Qi, G. Z.; Shen, Q.; Hu, J. Y.; Lin, Y. H., "Reactivity and structural characterization of divalent samarium aryloxide with diethylaluminum chloride". Chinese Science Bulletin 2003, 48 (20), 2164–2167.

External links

Organoaluminium compounds
Chlorides